FC Kreuzlingen is a Swiss football club from the town of Kreuzlingen in Canton Thurgau, the German-speaking region of Switzerland. The team currently plays in 2. Liga Interregional.

History

 In 1934 the club gained promotion to the Swiss Super League but refused to make the step up on financial grounds.
 In 2003/04 the club narrowly missed out on promotion to the Challenge League.

Stadium

The club play their home games at Sportplatz Hafenareal. The capacity is 1,200. The stadium has 200 seats and 1,000 standing places. The stadium is part of a complex on the banks of Lake Constance in the port area of the Freuzlingen. In 2007 a new club house was erected.

Supporters

In 1997 a small ground of fans got together to form a club called the Whiskeykurve. A small group of fans of the club who stand at an end of the ground known as the Whiskeykurve.

External links
Official Website 
Soccerway.com profile 
Football.ch profile 
Whiskykurve website 
supporter website with historical part 

Football clubs in Switzerland
Association football clubs established in 1905
Kreuzlingen
1905 establishments in Switzerland